Hutchinson is an unincorporated community in Marion County, West Virginia, United States.

References 

Unincorporated communities in West Virginia
Unincorporated communities in Marion County, West Virginia
Coal towns in West Virginia